Religious tourism in India is a focus of Narendra Modi's national tourism policy. Uttarakhand has been popular as a religious and adventure tourism hub.

Tourism by religion

India-origin religions 

Since India is birth place of Indian-origin religions, namely Hinduism, Jainism, Buddhism, and Sikhism, their holiest sites and highest concentration of religious sites pertaining to these religions are in India. Common pilgrim circuits, sites and practices are as follows:

 Parikrama pilgrim circuits and sites
 Pilgrim yatras and sites
 Sacred rivers and their ghats, notably Ganges, Yamuna, Sarasvati, Narmada
 Fairs, such as Kumbh Mela.

Buddhism 

The Mahabodhi Temple in Bodh Gaya is one of the holiest sites in Buddhism. Buddhist sites, many related to the travels of Buddha, are spread across India. Important Buddhist prikarma sites are, Bodh Gaya, Sarnath, Sravasti (Jetavana), Rajgir hills, Kurukshetra (Bodh Stupa on bank of Brahma Sarovar, pilgrimage undertaken by Lord Buddha), Shrughna (Yamunanagar, vihara visited by Buddha for sermon), Adi Badri (saraswati udgam sthal and vihara visited by Buddha), Parinirvana Stupa (place of death and nirvana of Lord Buddha at Kushinagar, and Sankissa. See also Buddhist pilgrimage sites.

Hinduism 

Hindus pilgrims in India undertake yatra (pilgrimage) to numerous sites, temples and samadhis (shrines) of saints) for puja and parikrama to earn punya with the aim to attain moksha. In order of importance for pilgrims in India, there are 4 Dhams (Char Dham) and 12 Jyotirlings devoted to the Lord Shiva, 51 Shakti Pithas devoted to the feminine manifestation of the god, and the important Lord Rama circuit (Ayodhya, Chitrakoot, Hampi and Rameswaram) and Lord Krishna circuit (Mathura, Vrindavan,Barsana, Govardhan, Kurukshetra, Dwarka and Bhalka). Sacred pilgrim sites related to Lord Rama are Ayodhya, Chitrakoot, Hampi and Rameswaram. Sacred pilgrim sites related to Lord Krishna are Mathura, Vrindavan,Barsana, Govardhan,Vraja Parikrama, 48 kos parikrama of Kurukshetra, Dwarka, Bhalka (place of death of Lord Krishna).

India has become a major destination for yoga tourism, bringing business to ashrams in places such as Mysore (for Ashtanga Yoga) and Rishikesh (for Sivananda Yoga, among others). That has led to the creation of many yoga schools offering teacher training and promotion of India as a "yoga tourism hub" by the Indian Ministry of Tourism and the Ministry of AYUSH.

Jain 

The holiest site of Jainism are spread across India.

Sikhism 
The Golden Temple is the holiest site in Sikhism.

The holy sites for Sikhs include the following in the order of importance:

 Panj Takht, namely Golden Temple, Takht Sri Patna Sahib, Nanded Hazur Sahib, Takht Sri Damdama Sahib Bhatinda, and Anandpur Sahib.

 Guru Nanak related places, he was the founder of Sikh religion. His birth and death places at Gurdwara Janam Asthan and Kartarpur Corridor (both in Pakistan} are considered sacred.

 Sikh martyrs's related sites who gave their lives for protecting dharma and Sikhism. These include Gurudwara Sis Ganj Sahib and Fatehgarh Sahib of martyrdom of Guru Tegh Bahadur and children of Guru Gobind Singh respectively by Muslim rulers for refusing to convert to Islam

 Place where Sikh gurus performed pilgrims and travels: Kurukshetra, Kapal Mochan, Paonta Sahib, etc.

 Capitals of important Sikh states: Lahore (capital of largest Sikh state of Maharaja Ranjit Singh) and Lohgarh (capital of Sikh state founded by Baba Banda Bahadur in Yamunanagar). Fateh Burj at Chapar Chiri where Banda bahadur defeated mughals in Battle of Chappar Chiri and avenged murder of Sikh gurus and their children is also considered important.

Foreign-origin religions

Baháʼí  

The roots of the Baháʼí Faith in India go back to the first days of the Bábí religion in 1844. For Baháʼís in India, the Lotus Temple in Delhi, is most well known Baháʼí House of Worship that was dedicated in December 1986.

Islam 
The dargahs or shrines of major Sufi figures in India, such as Ajmer Sharif and Nizamuddin, attract many Muslims. Qadian is a considered a holy city by Ahmadi Muslims.

Zoroastrianism 

Due to persecution of Zoroastrians, in other countries and the liberal atmosphere and patronisation of India, today the largest population of Zoroastrians resides in India. 

Zoroastrians,the practitioners of Zoroastrianism have been living in India since the Sasanian period (224-651 CE), started to migrate to India in successive waves migrations after the Muslim invasion of Persia when invading Muslim started religious persecution and Zoroastrianism suffered a decline in Iran, later another wave of migration to India started when Safavids forced their subjects to convert to Shiism. Zoroastrians in India, have numerous fire temples in India where they travel for worship.

See also
 Tourism in India

References

 
Tourism in India
Religious tourism